Luis Prieto may refer to:
Luis Jorge Prieto (es) (1926–1996), Argentinian semiotician
Luis Prieto (director) (born 1970), Spanish film director
Luis Prieto (footballer, born 1979), Spanish association football player
Luis Prieto (Paraguayan footballer) (born 1988), Paraguayan footballer for Ayacucho FC
a fictional character